The Best Female Action Sports Athlete ESPY Award is an annual award honoring the achievements of a female athlete from the world of action sports. It was first awarded as part of the ESPY Awards in 2004 after the non-gender-specific Best Action Sports Athlete ESPY Award was presented the previous two years (with the American snowboarder Kelly Clark receiving the 2002 award). It is given to the female, irrespective of nationality or sport contested, adjudged to be the best action sports athlete in a given calendar year. Balloting for the award is undertaken by fans over the Internet from between three and five choices selected by the ESPN Select Nominating Committee, which is composed of a panel of experts. It is conferred in July to reflect performance and achievement over the preceding twelve months.

The inaugural winner of the award was the American wakeboarder Dallas Friday. During 2003 and 2004, Friday won 12 of the available 14 professional women's titles, including national and world championships. She became the first wakeboarder to be nominated for, and hence to win, an ESPY Award. Athletes from the United States have won more times than any other nationality with ten (three times to snowboarders Jamie Anderson and Chloe Kim), followed by Australians with three, two of which went to the surfer Stephanie Gilmore. Snowboarders are most successful sportspeople, with eleven awards, followed by surfers with four. It was not awarded in 2020 due to the COVID-19 pandemic. The most recent winner of the award was Chinese freestyle skier Eileen Gu in 2022.

Winners

See also

 List of sports awards honoring women
 Best Male Action Sports Athlete ESPY Award
 Laureus World Sports Award for Action Sportsperson of the Year

References

External links 

 

ESPY Awards
Awards established in 2004
Sports awards honoring women
Women's sports in the United States